Thomas Wilbrandt (born 1952 in Bielefeld) is a German composer and conductor.

He studied with Franco Ferrara, Hans Swarowsky and Bruno Maderna in Rome, Vienna and Salzburg and was Assistant to Herbert von Karajan and the Berlin Philharmonic for three years in Berlin and Salzburg.

In 1980 he founded the Berlin Chamber Academy (Berliner Kammer-Akademie), a forty-piece orchestra originally formed from players of the Berlin Philharmonic, with whom he recorded a Mozart Series for RCA/Victor.

Next to international conducting activities and cooperations with orchestras such as the Berlin Philharmonic and the Philharmonia Orchestra in London, Wilbrandt became more involved in his own projects and recordings, concentrating on his work as a composer, especially in the field of Avant-garde and electronic music. This led to developed experimentation regarding multimedia content and expression and to the constant exploration of new forms of music presentation.

One of his first major projects was the creation of a fusion between acoustic orchestral playing and digital and electronic instruments and sounds, entitled THE ELECTRIC V., an approach to Vivaldi's concert cycle The Four Seasons. The first edition of THE ELECTRIC V. was released in 1984 in twenty countries. Wilbrandt wrote, directed, and produced THE ELECTRIC V. film between 1987 and 1990.

Wilbrandt contributed music to the soundtrack of Oliver Stone's film Natural Born Killers.

2011 saw the launch of FENNster, a Berlin-based Foundation for Contemporary Art and Multimedia Innovation, initiated by Thomas Wilbrandt.

Works and releases (selection)
The Mozart Series, Berliner-Kammer-Akademie. Conducted by Thomas Wilbrandt. RCA/VICTOR (1981-1989)
The Electric V. – A New Perspective on Vivaldi's Four Seasons (1984), Philharmonia Orchestra. Solo-violin Christopher Warren-Green. Created, arranged, and conducted by Thomas Wilbrandt. Mercury 818 147-2 (1984) Decca 425 205-2 (1988) Thamos 37501 (1999)
Antonio Vivaldi, The Four Seasons, Philharmonia Orchestra. Conducted by Thomas Wilbrandt. Solo-violin Christopher Warren-Green. Philips 412 321 (1984)
Transforming V. – Variations on Vivaldi, Royal Philharmonic Orchestra. Created, arranged, and conducted by Thomas Wilbrandt. Decca 425 211 (1990)
Erik Satie, Alone, for a Second, Modern Sinfonietta. Created, arranged, and conducted by Thomas Wilbrandt. Decca 425 226 (1991)
Modest P. Mussorgsky, Pictures at an Exhibition, Modern Sinfonietta. Orchestrated, arranged, and conducted by Thomas Wilbrandt. Decca 436 717 (1993)
Mussorgsky/Wilbrandt, Exhibitionistic Echoes (from Pictures at an Exhibition). A reworking for acoustic instruments and electronic delays Modern Sinfonietta. Decca 436 717 (1993)
Thomas Wilbrandt, Mono Tones – 12 Studies in Silence, for one and two pianos. Decca 440 228 (1993)
The Electric V. The Four Seasons Variations (Film c. 92 mins). Created, filmed, produced, and directed by Thomas Wilbrandt. Decca/Universal (1990) LD-Video 071 117

Performances
Alone, for a Second, choreography by Nacho Duato, Netherlands Dans Theater (1993) / Compania Nacional de Danza de Espana, Seville (2002)
Interlaced, choreography by Lynn Cote, ballet set to The Electric V, Washington Ballet (1996)
Anotimpuri (Seasons), choreography by Sergiu Anghel, ballet for 12 dancers set to "The Electric V.", Orion Ballet Company (1998)
Sea of my Soul, choreography by Patrick Corbin, Company C Contemporary Ballet, San Francisco (2007)

External links
FENNster 

Thomas Wilbrandt on Last.fm
Thomas Wilbrandt on Musicbrainz.com

1952 births
Living people
German classical composers
20th-century classical composers
German male classical composers
20th-century German composers
20th-century German male musicians